OntoWiki is a free and open-source semantic wiki application, meant to serve as an ontology editor and a knowledge acquisition system. It is a web-based application written in PHP and using either a MySQL database or a Virtuoso triple store. OntoWiki is form-based rather than syntax-based, and thus tries to hide as much of the complexity of knowledge representation formalisms from users as possible. OntoWiki is mainly being developed by the Agile Knowledge Engineering and Semantic Web (AKSW) research group at the University of Leipzig, a group also known for the DBpedia project among others, in collaboration with volunteers around the world.

In 2009 the AKSW research group got a budget of €425,000 from the Federal Ministry of Education and Research of Germany for the development of the OntoWiki.

In 2010 OntoWiki became part of the technology stack supporting the LOD2 (linked open data) project. Leipzig University is one of the consortium members of the project, which is funded by a €6.5m EU grant.

See also
 Semantic MediaWiki
 DBpedia

External links 
 
 About page on GitHub
 AKSW blog

References 

Semantic wiki software
Free integrated development environments
Knowledge representation
Ontology (information science)